Habitat for Humanity Ireland is a nonprofit development organisation which seeks to "bring people together to build homes, communities and hope".

In more than 70 countries around the world, including Ireland, Habitat for Humanity seeks to "construct, rehabilitate or preserve homes". Habitat for Humanity does not build houses for people, but works with homeowners and volunteers to construct, renovate or refurbish homes, using donations of money, land and materials. Once completed, houses are sold to partner families at no profit.

Habitat for Humanity Ireland runs both a "Global Village" programme which sends team of volunteers abroad, as well as a "Local Programme" based in Dublin.

Origins and patronage

Early in 2001, a group of individuals and representatives of churches and housing organisations from Dublin became interested in Habitat for Humanity's work. In June 2002, a core group headed to Durban, South Africa, for the Jimmy Carter Work Project to experience the work of Habitat for Humanity firsthand. Upon their return, they formed a steering board and started an affiliation process.

In November 2002, Habitat for Humanity International's founder met with then President Mary McAleese at Áras an Uachtaráin. On the same day the international board of directors approved the formation of Habitat for Humanity Ireland in Belfast.

In June 2012 it was announced that President of Ireland Michael D. Higgins had agreed to be sole patron of Habitat for Humanity Ireland. Individual supporters include Brent Pope, Bobby Kerr and Baz Ashmawy.

Programmes

Global initiatives
Since 2004 Habitat for Humanity Ireland has sent 2,300 volunteers abroad through its "Global Village" programme. Volunteers have built with Habitat affiliates in countries including Haiti, Zambia, Ghana, Mozambique, India, Cambodia, Costa Rica, El Salvador, Hungary and Romania. As of 2014, Habitat Ireland was in a 3-year partnership with Irish Aid in Zambia.

Irish programmes
Habitat for Humanity Ireland also runs a "local programme", which partners with local authorities and organisations in Dublin, to build and renovate houses in partnership with low-income families in the Dublin area. In 2012 the Local Programme project took place in Inchicore, Dublin. President of Ireland Michael D. Higgins visited the site and the homeowner families in April 2012. In 2014 Habitat renovated two properties in Dublin 1.

The "Brush with Kindness" programme is an initiative that seeks to "bring together other charities with commonly held goals to build healthy, resilient communities".

Education programmes include initiatives focused at schools, and companies.

Events
Every year, Habitat for Humanity Ireland sends volunteers to join participants from around the world in Jimmy Carter Work Project events.

In 2010, Brent Pope set up the Brent Pope Rugby Legends Foundation in partnership Habitat for Humanity Ireland. Pope has visited Zambia twice with the foundation, being accompanied by rugby player Malcolm O'Kelly in June 2011 and by Paddy Johns and Angus McKeen in June 2012.
In 2013, Pope and Paddy Johns travelled to Argentina.

References

External links
 Habitat for Humanity Ireland

Housing in the Republic of Ireland
Development charities based in the Republic of Ireland
Organizations established in 2002
2002 establishments in Ireland
Ireland